Quingestanol, also known as norethisterone 3-cyclopentyl enol ether, is a progestin of the 19-nortestosterone group which was never marketed. It is a prodrug of norethisterone. An acylated derivative, quingestanol acetate, is used as a pharmaceutical drug.

See also
 List of progestogens

References

Ethynyl compounds
Androgens and anabolic steroids
Cyclopentyl ethers
Dienes
Estranes
Prodrugs
Progestogen ethers
Progestogens